Strategic material is any sort of raw material that is important to an individual's or organization's strategic plan and supply chain management. Lack of supply of strategic materials may leave an organization or government vulnerable to disruption of the manufacturing of products which require those materials.  It can also refer to a group or department that manages these materials.

In government terms, they are materials, usually raw materials that have a particular strategic significance to a government or nation, often in time of war. Their strategic need is because of their crucial importance for either economic or military purposes. Some materials are relatively simple, but are required in great quantities during wartime. Others are obscure and technically complex. Although not required in large quantities, their irreplaceability and critical need makes them especially valuable. Foodstuffs are not generally classed as strategic materials: although vital, they are treated separately.

Techniques for replacing strategic materials with ersatz substitutes have become highly important. These also include the minimisation of or the recovery and recycling of such materials.

As well as depending upon strategic materials, warfare may be carried out with their specific goal in sight. Japanese expansion in World War II targeted rubber crops and their plantation areas in particular. Conflict between Germany and France has repeatedly focussed upon the iron and steel bulk resources of their border region.

In the US Armed Services
The US Defense Logistic Agency manages strategic materials for the US military.

In business
Strategic materials encompass a subset of raw materials required to make a product. The strategic materials may be limited in number or subject to shortages. In this case, the strategic plan would call for an alternative supply chain or alternative materials in the event of a breakdown in the current supply chain.

References

Supply chain management